Kamyar Cyrus Habib,  (born August 22, 1981) is an American Jesuit, former politician, lawyer, and educator who served as the 16th Lieutenant Governor of Washington from 2017 to 2021. As of the time of his departure from office, he was the first and only Iranian American official to hold statewide elected office in the United States.

He has been fully blind since he lost his eyesight to cancer at age eight. In March 2020, he announced plans to retire from politics and become a Jesuit priest.

Early life and education 
Habib was born in Baltimore, Maryland, to parents who had previously immigrated to the U.S. from Iran. A three-time cancer survivor, he lost his eyesight and became fully blind at age eight. Shortly afterwards, his family moved to Kirkland, Washington. Habib graduated from the Bellevue International School in 1999.

In 2003 he received his B.A. from Columbia University  summa cum laude and Phi Beta Kappa, having double majored in English and Comparative Literature and Middle Eastern Studies as a student of Edward Said and Jacques Derrida. While an undergraduate, Habib worked in the New York City office of Senator Hillary Clinton. He was named a Truman Scholar in 2002.
 
As a Rhodes Scholar, Habib obtained a Master of Letters in postcolonial English literature from St John's College, Oxford, where he was an active member of the Oxford Union, and wrote his masters thesis on Ralph Ellison and Salman Rushdie. He was named a Soros Fellow in 2007.

Habib then earned a J.D. from Yale Law School in 2009, where he served as an editor of the Yale Law Journal. He was a member of the university's Grand Strategy program, led by John Lewis Gaddis, Charles Hill, and Paul Kennedy. While a law student, he advocated for the redesign of U.S. currency to allow the blind to distinguish denominations. His roommate at Yale was Ronan Farrow.

After graduating from Yale, Habib practiced law at the Washington region's largest law firm, Perkins Coie, where from 2009 to 2017 he advised technology startups, and led the firm's civic and community initiatives.

Political career

State legislature 
In 2012, Habib won a seat in the Washington House of Representatives, defeating two-term Redmond City Councilman Hank Myers and gaining 61% of the vote. He was elected to represent Washington's 48th Legislative District, which includes Bellevue, Clyde Hill, Hunts Point, Kirkland, Medina, Redmond, and Yarrow Point. Habib set a record for the most money ever raised (over $340,000) in a State House race in Washington. In the House of Representatives, Habib was selected by his peers to serve as Vice Chair of the House Committee on Technology and Economic Development.

In 2014, Habib was elected to the Washington State Senate with 65% of the vote to succeed controversial Senate Majority Leader Rodney Tom as State Senator from the 48th Legislative District. Immediately after his election to the State Senate, Habib was elected Senate Democratic Whip by his fellow Democrats, placing him in one of the top leadership positions in the State Senate.

Lieutenant Governor 

Shortly before the 2016 legislative session, Habib announced his campaign for Lieutenant Governor of Washington, challenging embattled twenty-year incumbent Brad Owen. Several months later, Owen, who had previously filed campaign paperwork, announced that he would in fact not seek reelection. Habib went on to win the primary election against ten other candidates, including long-time State Senators Karen Fraser and Steve Hobbs. Another senior legislator, Speaker pro tem of the Washington House of Representatives Jim Moeller was also a candidate but ultimately discontinued his campaign. Habib defeated Republican Marty McClendon by a nine-point margin in the November 2016 general election. He raised over $1.1 million, and was supported in his campaign by President Barack Obama, who endorsed him and recorded robocalls encouraging voters to cast their ballots for him.

As Lieutenant Governor, he also served as President of the Washington State Senate.

On February 22, 2020, Habib endorsed South Bend Mayor Pete Buttigieg for president in anticipation of primary balloting on March 10. He co-chaired the Western states effort for Buttigieg.

Other affiliations
During his career in state politics, Habib maintained a number of other affiliations. Beginning in 2013, he was Professor and Distinguished Lawmaker in Residence at the Seattle University School of Law, teaching upper-level courses and conducts research on issues at the convergence of technology and public policy.

A member of the Council on Foreign Relations, he has also served on the boards of a number of nonprofit organizations, including the Seattle Symphony, Seattle Children's Hospital Foundation, the 5th Avenue Theatre, the Bellevue College Foundation, and the Bellevue Downtown Association.

Religious vocation
On March 19, 2020, Habib announced he would not run for re-election and he had decided to end his political career and become a Catholic priest. He had converted to Catholicism while studying at Oxford, and throughout his years in politics attended Mass at Seattle's St. James Cathedral. He began considering the priesthood in 2016 and was accepted by the Jesuits in 2019, with his entry deferred until the end of his term as lieutenant governor. Of the decision, he wrote in the Jesuits' America magazine that:Over the past couple of years ... I have felt a calling to dedicate my life in a more direct and personal way to serving the marginalized, empowering the vulnerable, healing those who suffer from spiritual wounds and accompanying those discerning their own futures.... I have come to believe that the best way to deepen my commitment to social justice is to reduce the complexity in my own life and dedicate it to serving others.He entered the Jesuit novitiate in Culver City, California in the fall of 2020. On August 13, 2022 Habib professed his first vows as a Jesuit.

Political priorities 
As lieutenant governor, Habib made expanding equitable access to higher education and promoting job growth through international trade office priorities.

In his first term, Habib established a number of college pathway programs for underserved and non-traditional student populations. In 2018, he founded Washington World Fellows, a global leadership program for high school students that includes a study abroad experience and two years of college preparation programming aimed at supporting first-generation college students. The same year, he initiated Complete Washington, a program focused on creating new high-demand degree pathways tailored to the needs of working adults.

In addition to his higher education programs, Habib created the leadership-oriented Boundless Washington program, which seeks to empower young people with disabilities through outdoor exploration and leadership training. He summited Mount Kilimanjaro in the summer of 2019 to help raise money for the program.

In Washington, the Lieutenant Governor traditionally acts as a trade ambassador for the state. Habib has led a number of international trips on behalf of the state aimed at improving market access for Washington-based companies and encouraging foreign investment.

Legislative positions

Higher education 
In 2018, he attacked the idea that "college isn't for everyone", calling it an "elitist" view, and said that "A failure to expand access to higher education will widen the gap between the fortunate few and the disenfranchised many." In 2020, his office introduced a legislative package focused on removing barriers in Washington state's higher education system. It would require all school districts to share financial aid information with twelfth-grade students and their families, a bill that would create a single college application process for public four-year institutions, and legislation that would prevent institutions of higher education from denying students access to their transcripts as a means of debt collection.

Economic development 
Habib is the author of a number of laws related to technology and the innovation economy. He authored the Washington Jobs Act of 2014, which allows investor crowdfunding for the first time in Washington, so that entrepreneurs and small businesses can more easily obtain access to capital.

He authored legislation that created a statewide framework for vehicle for hire companies and to provide insurance for drivers, passengers, and the public.

In the face of diminishing federal funding for cancer research, Habib introduced legislation to create a dedicated cancer research fund in Washington State.

Open government 
Habib introduced legislation to allow the public to comment on legislative proposals by submitting video testimony filmed on a smart phone–the first such bill in the nation. Habib's bill gained national recognition when included in a PBS report as one of the "Five Times the Daily Show Actually Influenced Policy". Habib said that he was inspired by John Oliver's success in engaging the public on the topic of net neutrality, and the subsequent use of remote testimony submitted online to the Federal Communications Commission by his viewers.

Habib was also the first Democratic state legislator to seek the impeachment of State Auditor Troy Kelley, who was facing more than a dozen federal criminal charges for tax evasion and fraud.

Social justice 
Habib is the prime sponsor of legislation in the State Senate to guarantee paid sick leave for nearly all Washington workers.

He is the Senate prime sponsor of the Washington Voting Rights Act, which aims to prevent cities and counties from using racially polarized voting systems.

Habib's 2015 bill to provide standard-issue ID cards to help exiting prison inmates with reentry into society has gained widespread support.

Civil legal aid is a priority Habib has fought to keep funded in the state budget. He has argued that cuts in such funding will most severely impact families facing foreclosure, domestic violence, predatory lending, and those needing help accessing veteran and disability benefits.

Habib also sponsored the Truth in Evictions Reporting Act, to ensure that wrongfully evicted tenants will be able to have their rental history corrected.

Environment and transportation 
Habib angered some Republicans when he proposed legislative language acknowledging that climate change is real and that human activity is a significant factor in its acceleration.

As a member of the Senate Transportation Committee, Habib played a critical role in the passage of a landmark transportation investment package that completes the SR 520 bridge replacement and the North Spokane Corridor, funds extensions of SR 167 and 509, adds new lanes to I-405, and authorizes the next generation of light rail and bus rapid transit in the central Puget Sound region. This was the first investment in transportation infrastructure in a decade.

Habib has also authored legislation give judges flexibility in reducing fines imposed for failure to pay bridge tolls.

Awards and recognition
Habib was the first Iranian-American elected to state office in the United States, elected to a state legislature the same day as Adrin Nazarian of California, and to date the highest ranking Iranian-American in public office as the first to serve in a statewide office.

In 2019, he served as co-chair of the Democratic National Lt. Governor's Association and he continues to serve as a member of the Democratic National Committee.

Habib has been a Truman Scholar, a Soros Fellow, and a Rodel Fellow at the Aspen Institute. He has been named a Young Global Leader by the World Economic Forum.

In 2019, he was awarded the Helen Keller Achievement Award by the American Foundation for the Blind. In 2020, the John F. Kennedy Library and The Harvard Institute of Politics presented him with the John F. Kennedy New Frontier Award for outstanding public service.

In 2014, Habib was named one of the "40 Under 40 Political Rising Stars" by The Washington Post. He was also named one of "12 State Legislators to Watch" by Governing Magazine. Seattle Magazine has named him one of the "most influential" people in the greater Seattle area.

Habib was chosen by the leadership of the Democratic National Committee to serve as one of 25 appointed members of the party's 2016 Platform Committee.

Other affiliations
Since 2013, Habib has been Professor and Distinguished Lawmaker in Residence at the Seattle University School of Law, where he teaches upper-level courses and conducts research on issues at the convergence of technology and public policy.

A member of the Council on Foreign Relations, he also serves on the boards of a number of nonprofit organizations, including the Seattle Symphony, Seattle Children's Hospital, and the 5th Avenue Theatre.

See also 
 List of minority governors and lieutenant governors in the United States

References

Additional sources

External links

|-

1981 births
21st-century American politicians
Alumni of St John's College, Oxford
American politicians of Iranian descent
American politicians with disabilities
American Rhodes Scholars
American blind people
Blind politicians
Catholics from Washington (state)
Columbia College (New York) alumni
Converts to Roman Catholicism
Lieutenant Governors of Washington (state)
Living people
Democratic Party members of the Washington House of Representatives
People from Bellevue, Washington
People from Kirkland, Washington
Politicians from Baltimore
Democratic Party Washington (state) state senators
Yale Law School alumni
People associated with Perkins Coie
American people of Iranian descent